The women's 800 metres at the 2022 World Athletics U20 Championships was held at the Estadio Olímpico Pascual Guerrero in Cali, Colombia from 1 to 3 August 2022.

42 athletes from 29 countries were originally entered to the competition. However; Sanae Hasnaoui from Morocco, Ramot Abike Jimoh from Nigeria and Tharushi Dissanayaka from Sri Lanka did not participated, while the third runner entered by the United States, Michaela Rose, was unable to compete since only two athletes per member nation can compete in each event.

Records
U20 standing records prior to the 2022 World Athletics U20 Championships were as follows:

Results

Round 1
The round 1 took place on 1 August, with the 38 athletes involved being splitted into 5 heats, 3 heats of 8 athletes and 2 of 7. The first 4 athletes in each heat ( Q ) and the next 4 fastest ( q ) qualified to the semi-final. The overall results were as follows:

Semi-final
The semi-final took place on 2 August, with the 24 athletes involved being splitted into 3 heats of 8 athletes each. The first 2 athletes in each heat ( Q ) and the next 2 fastest ( q ) qualified to the final. The overall results were as follows:

Final
The final (originally scheduled at 18:10) was started at 20:11 on 3 August. The results were as follows:

References

800 metres
800 metres at the World Athletics U20 Championships